LiveQuartz is a basic graphic editor developed for macOS by Romain Piveteau.

Each document is in a single window with layers and filters on both sides, tools are displayed on the top and document settings or at the bottom in the status bar. LiveQuartz features layers-based image editing, non destructive filters and selection, painting and retouching tools. LiveQuartz was one of the first public raster image editors built on top of Core Image to be made public.
In May 2005, when the first beta of iMage (the original name of LiveQuartz) was released, its singularity was that it was the first graphic editor to use two new Mac OS X Tiger frameworks: Core Image and Core Data. LiveQuartz was also, back in early 2005, the first macOS X image editing app to use a unique window user interface without "palettes".

Features 
 Uses technologies like Cocoa (API), Quartz (graphics layer), Core Data and Core Image.
 Uses layers-based editing and non destructive filters (filters can me merged onto their layer when using certain tools or when doing certain actions like cutting a selection, etc...).
 Selection and retouch tools.
 LiveQuartz provides unlimited (per document) undos (since app opening).
 Integrates with macOS and applications such as Photos. Support for Drag and Drop and standard image formats (JPEG, PNG, TIFF, HEIF).
 Pictures can be imported a lot of different ways: They can be drag and dropped from Finder or other applications. They can be opened from the "File" menu. They can be shared from the Photos app. They can be taken with an iSight camera from within the app, imported from a scanner or plugged camera or with an iOS device having the same iCloud account as the mac with Camera Continuity in macOS Mojave.
 Support for other macOS features such as multi-touch gestures, versions, auto save, and full screen mode.

Tools

Supported image file formats

Version history (in decreasing date order)

LiveQuartz

See also 
Comparison of raster graphics editors

References

External links 
 Rhapsoft website
 LiveQuartz Mac App Store page
 LiveQuartz Lite (with in-app subscriptions and purchases) Mac App Store page
 Ars Technica about LiveQuartz 1.0
 MacWorld about LiveQuartz 1.8

Raster graphics editors
MacOS graphics software
MacOS-only software